Historia de los Partidos Políticos Puertorriqueños (1898-1956) (English: History of the Puerto Rican Political Parties (1898-1956)) is Bolívar Pagán's 1959 flagship two-volume set on Puerto Rico's political parties. It covers political parties in the years since the American invasion of 1898 through the year 1956.

Historiography 
Although Pagán, a Puerto Rico senator (1933-1939) and U.S. Congressman (1939-1945), had written half a dozen other books on politics prior to this set, this set is considered the climax of his political penmanship. Critical reviewer Luis Burset states that "for its thoroughness, focus, and relevance, Bolívar Pagán's Historia de los Partidos Políticos Puertorriqueños is now mandatory reading for understanding the development of Puerto Rico's political parties... it enjoys a position of choice in the Puerto Rican historiography.

The two-volume set numbered Tomo I and Tomo II (volume I and volume II) consists of 342 and 399 pages, respectively. Volume 1 was published in 1959 and covers years 1898 to 1931. Volume II was published in 1972 and covers years 1932 to 1956.

Critical Reviews
The book has been reviewed by several critics, including Frank Otto Gatell, Thomas Mathews, and Luis Rafael Burset Flores.

Other publications by Bolivar Pagán
America y Otras Paginas. Imprenta La Correspondencia, San Juan, Puerto Rico, 1922.
Ley Municipal Revisada, Anotada y Comentada. Imprenta La Correspondencia, San Juan, Puerto Rico, 1925.
Ideales en Marcha. Imprenta Venezuela, San Juan, Puerto Rico, 1939.
Puerto Rico: The Next State. Imprenta Dwyer, Washington, D.D., 1942.
Crónicas de Washington. Editorial Stylo, Ciudad de Mejico, Mejico, 1949.
Historia de los Partidos Politicos Puertorriqueños. Litografía Real Hermanos, Inc., San Juan, Puerto Rico, 1959.
Historia de los Partidos Politicos Puertorriqueños (1898-1956). Librería Campos, San Juan, Puerto Rico, 1959 (vol I) and 1972 (vol II).

See also 

 List of political parties in Puerto Rico
 Politics of Puerto Rico
 Political party strength in Puerto Rico

References

External links
 The entire Volume I text is available for viewing at The University of Florida online resources library..
 The entire Volume II text is available for viewing at The University of Florida online resources library..
 Otto Gatell's review is available for online viewing at The JSTOR Iberoamérica Collection.
 Thomas Mathews's review is available for online viewing at The JSTOR Arts & Sciences I Collection.
Luis Rafael Burset Flores's review is available for online viewing at Academia.

Puerto Rican literature
1959 books
1972 books
Political history of Puerto Rico